The Fiftieth Oklahoma Legislature was a meeting of the legislative branch of the government of Oklahoma, composed of the Senate and the House of Representatives. It  met in Oklahoma City from January 4, 2005 to January 2, 2007, during the second two years of the first term of Governor Brad Henry. The Democratic Party held the majority of the state senate seats and the Republican Party held the majority of seats in the Oklahoma House of Representatives. The 2005 session was marked by the enactment of the Tax Relief Act of 2005. The 2006 session was marked by the enactment of the Kelsey Smith-Briggs Child Protection Reform Act.

Dates of sessions
Organizational day: January 4, 2005
First regular session: February 7, 2005 – May 27, 2005
Special sessions: May 27, 2005 - June 6, 2005, August 30–31, 2005
Second regular session: February 6, 2006 – May 26, 2006
Special session: May 25, 2006 - May 26, 2006, June 21–23, 2006

Previous: 49th Legislature • Next: 51st Legislature

Party Affiliation

Senate

House of Representatives

Major legislation

Enacted

2005
Education - HB 1992 created the Academic Achievement Award Program.
Education - SB 531 allowed school districts to exceed their carryover funds for two years without penalty.
Health care - SB 547 created a one-stop prescription program for the uninsured.
Health care - HB 1088 secured Oklahoma State University Medical Schools' residency programs.
Health care - HB 1411 created the Physician Assistant Scholarship Program.
Juveniles - SB 458 required courts to sentence juveniles as an adult if they assault an employee of the Juvenile Affairs Office.
Roads and bridges - HB 1078 increased funding for road and bridge repair.
Tax Relief Act of 2005 - HB 1547 and SB 435 increased the standard deduction and reduced the top income tax rate.
War memorial - created a War on Terror Memorial Design Committee.
Veterans - HB 1476 increased the income tax exemption for retirement benefits for veterans.
Victim's rights - HB 1698 prohibited the appearance of names and addresses for sex crime victims on court website.

2006
Kelsey Smith-Briggs Child Protection Reform Act - HB 2840 gave the Oklahoma Department of Human Services and judges the authority to request investigative resources from the Oklahoma State Bureau of Investigation and gave child advocates greater input into review procedures in order to address child abuse.
Stand Your Ground - HB 2615 extended existing legal protections for law-abiding citizens to use deadly force to protect themselves and their families from intruders in their homes to other locations such as vehicles.

Leadership

Senate
President of the Senate: Lieutenant Governor Mary Fallin
President Pro Tempore of the Senate: Mike Morgan
Majority Floor Leader: Ted Fisher
Majority Whip: Susan Paddack
Republican Minority Leader: Glenn Coffee
Republican Caucus Chair: Jonathan Nichols

House of Representatives
Speaker: Todd Hiett
Democratic Minority Leader: Jari Askins

Members

Senate

House of Representatives

See also
Oklahoma state elections, 2004

References

Oklahoma legislative sessions
2005 in Oklahoma
2006 in Oklahoma
2005 U.S. legislative sessions
2006 U.S. legislative sessions